Jermaine Leong (born 19 December 1998; Chinese: 梁任宇; pinyin: Liáng Rènyǔ) is an English singer from Singapore. She was the winner of the second season of The Final 1 in 2015. Thereafter, she has been managed by Hype Records.

Career
Leong started as a child actor in Housewives' Holiday, a 2009 Chinese drama televised on Mediacorp Channel 8.

In 2010, she was cast in okto's Dream School 1 and 2, a television series with song and dance elements.

In 2012, Leong was selected to sing Singapore Youth Festival's 2012 theme song "Live Our Story".

In 2018, Leong took on the lead role in Mediacorp Channel 5's FAM !, co-starring with Gurmit Singh, Vernetta Lopez and Benjamin Kheng.

The Final 1 and debut album 

In 2015, Leong auditioned for the second season of The Final 1, singing Bruno Mars' It Will Rain. After the regional auditions, the producers shortlisted her as a potential contestant and eventually moved on to the next round as one of the 12 girls in the final 24. 

At the Top 24 round as part of Group 1, Leong sang Steal My Girl together with Vanessa Devi, Shanice Hedger and Ruth Matthews as the whole group, and Blank Space in the solo round, and was sent through to the next round. She sang Lay Me Down in the Top 16 round and made it through to the finals, singing A Sky Full of Stars as a group of top 10 finalists and Almost Is Never Enough in the solo segment of the Identity round.

Following the eliminations of Lou Peixin and Shanice Hedger, Leong made it to the last semi-final show along with Charlene Su and Odelle Sabrin as the final three contestants and as females. On 4 October, Jermaine duetted with Jessica Sanchez, the runner-up of the eleventh season of the American Idol. During the same night, she sang her winner's single, "Shine", a song written and composed by Ken Lim. 

At the end of the final results show, Leong won the competition.

Personal life 
Leong was born in Singapore on 19 December 1998. She studied in CHIJ Our Lady of the Nativity, CHIJ Saint Joseph's Convent, and in Temasek Polytechnic, studying for Diploma in Communications & Media Management.

Jermaine has been singing contemporary worship music at the New Creation Church.

Discography

Filmography

References

External links 
 
 Jermaine Leong on Hype Records

1998 births
Living people
21st-century Singaporean women singers
Singaporean television actresses